Celerino Castillo (born 1949) is a former agent for the United States Drug Enforcement Administration (DEA).

Early life and military service
Castillo was a detective sergeant with a Texas Police Department from 1974 until 1979, and graduated from the University of Texas–Pan American in 1976 with a BS in Criminal Justice. He served in the United States Army during the Vietnam War.

Drug Enforcement Administration
While in Vietnam, Castillo had witnessed first-hand the effects of drug abuse on his soldiers. In 1979, he joined the DEA as an enforcement agent in America's "War on Drugs", specializing in undercover investigation and acting as a foreign diplomat for six years in South and Central America. He is best known for blowing the whistle on the CIA-backed arms-for-drugs trade used to prop up the 1980s Contra counter-insurgency in Nicaragua, and for the book that he wrote on that subject, entitled Powder Burns: Cocaine, Contras and the Drug War and released in 1994, two years after he had left the DEA.

Later career and arrest
After leaving the DEA Castillo worked as a private investigator, and also worked to promote his book, appearing on television and lecturing at various universities on the drug war and US foreign policy in Latin America. Since 1997 he has been accepted as an expert witness in federal courts on Outrageous Government Conduct, Informants, and Racial Profiling.

In 2008 (three years before Operation Fast and Furious became publicly known) Castillo told reporter Bill Conroy that agents from the Bureau of Alcohol, Tobacco, Firearms and Explosives (ATF) agents were participating in the smuggling of high powered weapons into Mexico. According to Castillo the source of that information was a government informer who was later murdered.

In March 2008, Celerino Castillo was arrested for selling firearms without a permit (selling legally-purchased weapons without a firearms-dealer permit). He claimed at that time that he was being targeted by the government in retaliation for his attempts to reveal the illegal activities of government agencies. He pleaded guilty on the advice of his attorney and was sentenced to 37 months in prison. It was later revealed that his attorney was, at the time of his plea, suspended by the State Bar of Texas for misapplying clients' funds. According to Castillo that was not the only impropriety in the handling of his criminal case. In a letter to the judge (Furgeson) who had overseen the case and handed down the sentence, he stated that the prosecutor had lied to the judge at his sentencing. He was scheduled for release in April, 2012.

See also 
 Allegations of CIA drug trafficking
 American Drug War: The Last White Hope
 CIA involvement in Contra cocaine trafficking
 Gary Webb
 Iran-Contra Affair
 Ricky Ross (drug trafficker)

References

Bibliography

External links

 Report of Investigation Concerning Allegations of Connections Between CIA and The Contras in Cocaine Trafficking to the United States, CIA
  The Contras, Cocaine, and Covert Operations: Documentation of Official U.S. Knowledge of Drug Trafficking and the Contras, A collection of declassified documents at the National Security Archive
 Snow Job: The Establishment's Papers Do Damage Control for the CIA, By Norman Solomon, in Extra!, Fairness and Accuracy in Reporting's magazine
 Department of Justice: The CIA-Contra-Crack cocaine controversy: A review of the Justice Department's investigations and prosecutions (December, 1997)

1949 births
Living people
People from Texas
Drug Enforcement Administration agents
United States Army personnel of the Vietnam War
United States Army soldiers